This is a list of cities and villages along the Maumee River in the United States.

Alphabetically

Antwerp, Ohio
Defiance, Ohio
Florida, Ohio
Fort Wayne, Indiana
Grand Rapids, Ohio
Maumee, Ohio
Napoleon, Ohio
New Haven, Indiana
Perrysburg, Ohio
Rossford, Ohio
Toledo, Ohio
Waterville, Ohio

Downstream, Fort Wayne to Toledo

Fort Wayne, Indiana
New Haven, Indiana
Antwerp, Ohio
Defiance, Ohio
Florida, Ohio
Napoleon, Ohio
Grand Rapids, Ohio
Waterville, Ohio
Maumee, Ohio
Perrysburg, Ohio
Rossford, Ohio
Toledo, Ohio

By Population

Toledo, Ohio
Fort Wayne, Indiana
Perrysburg, Ohio
Defiance, Ohio
Maumee, Ohio
New Haven, Indiana
Napoleon, Ohio
Rossford, Ohio
Waterville, Ohio
Antwerp, Ohio
Grand Rapids, Ohio
Florida, Ohio

Maumee River, List of cities and towns along the

Maumee